Johannes Rindal (born 22 February 1984 in Dovre) is a Norwegian politician for the Centre Party.

He served as a deputy representative to the Norwegian Parliament from Oppland during the term 2005–2009.

On the local level he has been a member of Dovre municipality council.

He was the leader of the Centre Youth from 2009 to 2011.

References

1984 births
Living people
People from Dovre
Centre Party (Norway) politicians
Deputy members of the Storting
Oppland politicians
21st-century Norwegian politicians